La otra mujer (English: "The Other Woman") is a 1972 Mexican comedy drama film directed by Julián Soler and starring Mauricio Garcés, Saby Kamalich and María Duval. The film is a remake of the Mexican film Mi esposa y la otra (1952), which in turn is a remake of the Argentine film The Kids Grow Up (1942).

Plot
Cristina (Saby Kamalich) and Ricardo (Félix González) have three children: Pablo (José Luis Moreno), Martha (Paula Cusi) and Claudia (Delia Peña Orta), but they are not married, because Ricardo is married to another woman, Alicia (María Duval). When he finds himself in a hurry when it seems that Alicia is going to find out about her secret life, Ricardo asks Alicia's cousin, Antonio (Mauricio Garcés), to help him by pretending to be Cristina's husband.

Cast
Mauricio Garcés as Antonio
Saby Kamalich as Cristina Martínez
Félix González as Ricardo
Paula Cusi as Martha
María Duval as Alicia
José Luis Moreno as Pablo
Delia Peña Orta as Claudia
Gilberto Román as Martha's Boyfriend
Jorge Patiño as Card Player
Jorge Fegan as Card Player
Inés Murillo as Sebastiana, maid
Víctor Alcocer
Luis Miranda
Dolores Camarillo
Sheila Donne as Mamacita Americana
Ana Lilia Tovar as Antonio's Girlfriend
Luciano Hernández de la Vega
Ricardo Adalid
Enrique Pontón

Reception
Comparing the film with its previous 1952 and 1942 film versions, Emilio García Riera said that the films of 1942 and 1952 were better. Due to the scene that shows Garcés's character accompanied by an English-speaking blonde woman during a card game, in Stereotyped Images of United States Citizens in Mexican Cinema, 1930-1990, David E. Wilt cited the film as one of the films in Mexican cinema that extolled the figure of the blonde woman as an object of desire in Mexico.

References

External links

1972 films
1970s Spanish-language films
1972 comedy-drama films
Mexican comedy-drama films
Films directed by Julián Soler
1970s Mexican films